According to the Electoral Code of Ukraine, the next Ukrainian parliamentary election should be held on the last Sunday of October of the fifth year of authority of the parliament, if snap elections are not held. The previous parliamentary election in Ukraine was held on 21 July 2019. The status of the election is uncertain due to the 2022 Russian invasion of Ukraine.

Background
The previous parliamentary elections in 2019 were snap ones, called in July instead of the scheduled late October date, while the Ukrainian constitution determine the dates of legislative election in a rigid way, causing its term to be nearly one year shorter. According to Article 76 of the Constitution of Ukraine, the term of office of Ukraine's parliament is five years. Hence the powers of the 9th Ukrainian Verkhovna Rada will formally expire in September 2024. So, the fifth and final year of the parliament's powers will begin in September 2023. According to Article 77 of the Constitution, regular elections to the Verkhovna Rada take place on the last Sunday of October of the fifth year of parliamentary powers. Thus, the next parliamentary elections are due to take place on 29 October 2023.

Because of legislative gridlock, there were rumors that President Volodymyr Zelenskyy would call for snap elections in 2021, but also that he could use a provision to "collide"  parliament's term with the 2024 Ukrainian presidential election.

Electoral system
On 1 January 2020 the latest revision of the electoral code of Ukraine took effect. It states that all deputies are elected on a party list in one nationwide constituency with a 5% election threshold with open regional lists of candidates for deputies. The new election law abolishes the single-member constituency system used since the 2012 parliamentary election. Under the previous system, the 450 members of the Verkhovna Rada were elected by two methods; 225 by closed list proportional representation in a nationwide constituency with a 5% threshold, and 225 in single-member constituencies by first-past-the-post voting.

On 4 February 2020 parliament approved (with 236 votes) a presidential bill to reduce the number of parliamentary deputies from 450 to 300. To do so, the Ukrainian Constitution needs to be altered, and this will require at least 300 parliamentary votes.

Parties
The table below lists parties currently represented in the Verkhovna Rada.

Former party

Suspended parties 
Martial law in Ukraine was declared on 24 February 2022. On 15 March 2022 the Parliament deprived Opposition MP Illia Kyva of his mandate.

On 20 March 2022, several political parties were suspended by the National Security and Defense Council of Ukraine for the period of martial law:
 Opposition Platform — For Life
 Derzhava 
 Left Opposition
 Nashi 
 Opposition Bloc 
 Party of Shariy 
 Progressive Socialist Party of Ukraine 
 Socialist Party of Ukraine 
 Socialists 
 Union of Left Forces 
 Volodymyr Saldo Bloc

Opinion polls

See also
2019 Ukrainian parliamentary election
2024 Ukrainian presidential election

Notes

References

External links
 Central Election Commission of Ukraine

Parliamentary elections in Ukraine
Future elections in Ukraine